The 2007–08 UTEP Miners men's basketball team represented the University of Texas at El Paso in the 2007–08 college basketball season. The team was led by second-year head coach Tony Barbee. In 2006–07, the Miners finished 14–17 (6–10 in C-USA). UTEP averaged 8,145 fans per game, ranking 67th nationally.

References

UTEP Miners men's basketball seasons
Utep
Utep